Augustana University College was a Lutheran college in Camrose, Alberta, Canada, from 1910 until it merged in 2004 with the University of Alberta, becoming its Augustana Faculty.

History
In 1910 Norwegian settlers in the area around Camrose established a school under the name Camrose Lutheran College. It was initially a secondary school, and was operated by a group of Alberta Lutheran congregations, the Alberta Norwegian Lutheran College Association. Augustana began offering university work in the fall of 1959 as an affiliated college of the University of Alberta and added a second year of the university transfer program in 1969. It became Alberta's first private university in 1985 when the first B.A. degrees were granted.

On July 1, 2004, Augustana University College merged with the University of Alberta to become a separate faculty and satellite campus of the university.

References

External links
Augustana Faculty, University of Alberta website

Defunct universities and colleges in Canada
Educational institutions established in 1910
Universities in Alberta
Camrose, Alberta
Private universities and colleges in Canada
2004 disestablishments in Alberta
Educational institutions disestablished in 2004
1910 establishments in Alberta